United Sikkim Football Club  is an Indian I-League football club based in Gangtok, Sikkim. The club, which was founded in 2008, is the only club from Sikkim to play in the I-League and the second club from North East India. The club which is co-owned by Dubai based Fidelis World, former India football captain Baichung Bhutia, and Indian music singer Shankar Mahadevan, was founded in order to give the people of the Indian state of Sikkim a team.

Key

 P = Played
 W = Games won
 D = Games drawn
 L = Games lost
 F = Goals for
 A = Goals against
 Pts = Points
 Pos = Final position

 IL = I-League
 IL 2 = I-League 2nd Division

 Group = Group stage

Seasons

References

Seasons
 
United Sikkim
Indian football club seasons by club